The Palazzina Reale delle Cascine (Royal Palace of the Cascine) is a small Neoclassical palace sited on the Piazzale delle Cascine within the public park (Parco delle Cascine) located along the north bank of the Arno river just north of central Florence, Italy.  Built in the mid-18th century by the Lorraine Duke of Florence, in 2020 now houses part of the offices of the faculty of agricultural and forestry sciences of the University of Florence.

History
The Grand Duke Peter Leopold of the house of House of Habsburg-Lorraine, transformed the lands that the former Medici rulers had used as a farm and hunting ground into a public park around 1765. At the site, he built this small palace, also described as a casino, which in its time described an often rural or semi-rural house for out-door or garden jaunts or entertainment. Planning of the two story structure was begun in 1785 by the artist and architect Gaspare Maria Paoletti, who was soon replaced by his young pupil Giuseppe Manetti. The road network around the building was designed by the architect Giuseppe Cacialli.

By the nineteenth century the Florentine park management offices were housed in the Palazina, and a part was rented to the Italian-English Giacomo Thompson who built an iron and glass roof built in the courtyard behind the building, were he housed his Caffè Ristorante Doney. 

After a number of transitions, in 1936 the Palazzina was transformed into the Faculty of Agricultural and Forestry Sciences of the University of Florence.

Description
The main facade of the building faces south over the piazzale delle Cascine, gardens and a fountain toward the Arno River. Till well into the twentieth century this area contained a series of buildings, impairing the vista of the river. The facade has a ground-story brick portico with seven arches each flanked by bas-relief medallions, designed by Giuseppe Manetti, depicting activities related to the care and husbandry of cattle. On the second floor,  there are seven gabled windows, framed by paired pilasters. Some rooms on the first floor are frescoed with mythological subjects, such as the Sala Pompeiana (frescoed by Giuseppe Sorbolini in 1789), the Sala delle Feste (decorated by Luigi Mulinelli), the Sala di Flora, the Sala di Bacchus and the Gallery (decorated by Giuseppe Castagnoli and Gaetano Gucci). In the Gallery, today the Aula Magna, there are plaster statues, burnished to imitate bronze, depicting the Bacchae, sculpted by Luigi Acquisti.

The two side buildings were originally used as stables (on the lower floors) and barns (on the upper ones). On the back were the original houses of the peasants.

Images

Bibliography
Sandra Carlini, Lara Mercanti, Giovanni Straffi, I Palazzi parte prima. Arte e storia degli edifici civili di Firenze, Alinea, Florence 2001.
L.Zangheri (curated by), Alla scoperta della Toscana lorenese. L'architettura di Giuseppe e Alessandro Manetti e Carlo Reishammer, 1984, Florence.

Palaces in Florence
Neoclassical architecture in Florence
18th-century establishments in Italy